Denis "Den" Hegarty (born 13 September 1954, Dublin, Ireland) is a rock and roll, doo-wop and a cappella singer, television presenter, and psychology lecturer.

Biography

Darts (1976–1978) 

At an early age Hegarty moved to Brighton, England. Hegarty formed the 1950s styled band, Darts in August 1976, along with vocalists Rita Ray, Griff Fender and sax player Horatio Hornblower, all of whom he had played with in the band Rocky Sharpe & the Razors (pre-Rocky Sharpe and the Replays). His role in Darts was as the bass singer, songwriter, arranger and music director. 

Described as "wild eyed", "wild haired and manic", "maniacal", and as a "kinetic and charismatic performer", Hegarty gave the group a distinctive, anarchic edge. As the former BBC radio executive Lesley Douglas later recalled of a 1970s gig: "I remember sitting in the front row terrified of the Darts singer Den Hegarty, because all the papers had said that he was the mad man of music and that he would dive into the crowd". Music journalist Will Hodgkinson recounted another incident, during a Spanish eurovision TV show in 1979, where "the grandiosity of the whole affair proved too much for the bug-eyed Hegarty, who felt compelled to jump into a fountain and roll around in it, mid-performance", before taking off his socks and wringing them down the neck of actress Sylvia Kristel. Dave Haslam recalled how Hegarty "had a thing for clambering on the speaker stacks at the side of the stage (by far the highlight of the set)".

After Darts (1978–) 

Hegarty left Darts in 1978. He signed to Mercury Records and released a solo single "Voodoo Voodoo" in March 1979 which was his only solo hit, reaching number 73 in the UK Singles Chart. The following year, he made a guest appearance on The Clash's album Sandinista!.

Hegarty moved into broadcasting, hosting the Tyne Tees Television show Alright Now. After working for BBC Radio 1 (presenting Talkabout), and featuring in three series of Jack Good's final television show, Let's Rock, he moved on to host the final series of Tiswas along with DJ Gordon Astley, comedian/impressionist Fogwell Flax, and Sally James. Hegarty's contributions included "inexplicably sitting in a bathtub full of baked beans or providing loud 'BONG's in his booming bass tones for a section aping the 10 o'clock news called News At Den". After the demise of Tiswas, Hegarty became a cable show quizmaster, and then took another direction providing voices for animated characters in television advertisements.

Hegarty lives with his wife and one son in Devon. He now works as a lecturer in psychology at Exeter College and with the Open University, but he is still singing. He has fronted an a cappella band called Slackapella, plus a 15-piece outfit called Soul Traders, and still sings with the doo-woppers, The Metrotones. Hegarty helped revive Darts in 2006 and still performs at occasional gigs with the reformed band.

References

1954 births
Living people
Singers from Dublin (city)
Irish male singer-songwriters
Television personalities from Dublin (city)
20th-century Irish people
21st-century Irish people